Stanislava Stanislavovna Komarova (born 12 June 1986 in Moscow) is a retired Russian swimmer. She won the silver medal in the 200 m backstroke at the 2004 Summer Olympics in Athens. Komarova was one of the few modern swimmers who competed without goggles.

In 2006, having parted with her long-time coach Alexey Krasikov, she moved to Tenero, Switzerland, where for a while she trained with Guennadi Touretski. She retired in 2008, aged 22, after a conflict with the Russian Swimming Federation. In 2012-2015 she worked as a sports commentator  for NTV (Russia) and hosted the programme "Football Haute Couture". As of 2018 she works as a trainer, for her own Stanislava Komarova Swimming Group (SKSG) which she started in 2014 in Moscow.

Komarova is the recipient of the Medal of the Order "For Merit to the Fatherland" (2005). She is decorated with the title Meritorious Master of Sports in Russia.

In 2009 she married the volleyball player Aleksey Ostapenko, they divorced in 2011. Her second husband Andrey is a grandson of the tennis player and later commentator Anna Dmitrieva.

References

External links 
 Profile  on sports-reference.com

1986 births
Living people
Swimmers from Moscow
Russian female swimmers
Russian female backstroke swimmers
Swimmers at the 2004 Summer Olympics
Swimmers at the 2008 Summer Olympics
Olympic swimmers of Russia
Olympic silver medalists for Russia
World Aquatics Championships medalists in swimming
European Aquatics Championships medalists in swimming
Medalists at the 2004 Summer Olympics
Olympic silver medalists in swimming
Recipients of the Medal of the Order "For Merit to the Fatherland" II class